John Ward (24 June 1704 – 30 October 1773) was an English actor and theatre manager. The founder of the Warwickshire Company of Comedians – a Birmingham-based theatre company who toured throughout the West Midlands and into Wales during the mid to late eighteenth century – he was the first of the Kemble family theatrical dynasty, whose most notable member was his granddaughter Sarah Siddons. Ward was the first recorded performer of a Shakespearian play in Stratford-upon-Avon, and is also notable as the author of the two earliest surviving prompt books of Shakespeare's Hamlet, which reveal how the play was performed in eighteenth century England and also throw light on earlier practice.

References

Bibliography

1704 births
1773 deaths
18th-century English male actors
English theatre managers and producers
Actor-managers
English male stage actors